This is a list of singles that have peaked in the Top 10 of the Billboard Hot 100 during 1967.

Aretha Franklin scored five top ten hits during the year with "I Never Loved a Man (The Way I Love You)", "Respect", "Baby I Love You", "(You Make Me Feel Like) A Natural Woman", and "Chain of Fools", the most among all other artists.

Top-ten singles

1966 peaks

1968 peaks

See also
 1967 in music
 List of Hot 100 number-one singles of 1967 (U.S.)
 Billboard Year-End Hot 100 singles of 1967

References

General sources

Joel Whitburn Presents the Billboard Hot 100 Charts: The Sixties
Additional information obtained can be verified within Billboard's online archive services and print editions of the magazine.

1967
United States Hot 100 Top 10